Pabbay is an uninhabited island in the Outer Hebrides of Scotland which lies in the Sound of Harris between Harris and North Uist.  The name comes from Papey, which is Norse for "Island of the papar (Culdee)".

 The island was once very fertile, supporting a three-figure population and exporting corn, barley and illicit whisky.  Most of the stewards of St. Kilda were Pabbay men.  The island was cleared for sheep in 1846. Pabbay is traditionally a home of Clan Morrison.

Pabbay lies within the South Lewis, Harris and North Uist National Scenic Area, one of 40 such areas in Scotland which are defined so as to identify areas of exceptional scenery and to ensure its protection from inappropriate development.

Footnotes

Islands of the Sound of Harris
Cleared places in the Outer Hebrides
Uninhabited islands of the Outer Hebrides